Polygonum plebeium, the common knotweed, is a species of flowering plant in the knotweed family, found natively throughout much of South Asia including India, in Madagascar, and introduced to the United States and Australia. It occurs in disturbed habitats that frequently are flooded, such as banks, ditches, and rice fields. It is used as a vegetable in food in some locations.

Native names
 Machechi •  Tarakmana •  Gulabi Godhadi • Bengali: Chemti sag • Oriya: Muthisag • Gujarati: Zinako Okhrad •  Sarpakshee at Pocharam lake, Andhra Pradesh, India.

References

plebeium